Ullathil Nalla Ullam is a 1988 Tamil-language action film directed by Manivannan. The film stars Vijayakanth, Radha, Radha Ravi and Madhuri. It was released on 13 April 1988.

Plot 

The tragedy of the lead character is twofold, he is Don but is unhappy with his past and wants to turn a new leaf but cannot : the essence  of the first tragedy is that there are two buts. The second  is that despite being a crook by reputation, is a goodhearted crook .

He falls in love with a police official. This girl breathes idealistic fire and not only does she vow to have him breathing the musty jail air but worse scorns his love. She heaps insult upon insult but he sticks to his guns. That his love for her is a firm as rock would itself have made her heart like illfrozen icecream in the sun  but he  also turns up at the right moment and protects her honour that a gang of rapists was just about the foot.

The unkindest cut the type of violence that the film indulges in comes when she accuses her benefactor of having engineered the whole incident. When she learns the truth they join forces to settle scores with the villains, the don's associate and corrupt police chief.

Cast 
Vijayakanth as Michael Raj
Radha as Sheela
Radha Ravi as Peter
Madhuri as Lakshmi
Vinu Chakravarthy as Police inspector
Janagaraj as Michael Raj's father
Charle as Gnanavel
Senthil as Acolyte of Michael Raj
Vijayan as Police commissioner
Santhana Bharathi as Father
Kamala Kamesh
Disco Shanthi

Soundtrack 
Soundtrack was composed by Gangai Amaran.

Reception 
The Indian Express wrote, "One of the faults of the film is that it drags on and on [..] Manivannan's direction has few stylish touches but he makes up for this lapse by a great deal of crudity". Jeyamanmadhan of Kalki felt various actors such as Vijayan, Madhuri, Kamala Kamesh and Janagaraj were wasted, and that Sabapathy's cinematography overshadowed Manivannan's direction.

References

External links 
 

1980s Tamil-language films
1988 action films
1988 films
Films directed by Manivannan
Films scored by Gangai Amaran
Indian action films